Fenerbahçe is a major sports club based in Istanbul, Turkey, that competes in the Turkish Super League. The club was founded in 1907 in the Kadıköy district of Istanbul by Ziya Songülen and Necip Okaner. At the time, Turkish youth were not allowed to play football under Ottoman rule, so the club was originally very secretive. Fenerbahçe was one of the founding members of the Turkish Super League in 1959, and is one of three clubs, alongside Beşiktaş and Galatasaray, to have never been relegated from the league. Below is a list that shows the seasons played by Fenerbahçe in Turkish football, from 1959 to the most recent completed season. It details the club's achievements in major competitions. The club has won the nationwide championships (Super League, National Division and Turkish Football Championship) a record 28 times, the local Istanbul Football Leagues a record 16 times, the Turkish Cup six times, the Turkish Super Cup nine times, the Chancellor Cup a record eight times, the Istanbul Shield a record four times, the Istanbul Football Cup one time, the TSYD Cup 12 times, the Fleet Cup a record four times, the Atatürk Cup a record two times, and the Spor Toto Cup and Balkans Cup once. Overall, Fenerbahçe is the most successful club in Turkish football history with 92 titles won in total.

Past seasons

References

Notes

 
Fenerbahce
Seasons